Gustavsberg is a locality situated in Sundsvall Municipality, Västernorrland County, Sweden with 254 inhabitants in 2010.

References 

Medelpad
Populated places in Sundsvall Municipality